Dor is a moshav in northern Israel. Located near Zikhron Ya'akov, it falls under the jurisdiction of Hof HaCarmel Regional Council. It was named after the ancient Phoenician city of Dor, which was inhabited by the tribe of Manasseh in the Israelite period.

History

Tel Dor

The earliest remains at the Tel Dor site date back to the Canaanite period ending about 1200 BCE. Later, the Shkil tribe of sea raiders inhabited Tel Dor, as described in the letters of the Egyptian traveler Wen-Amon. The Phoenicians settled at Dor approximately 1100 BCE, and subsequently it became King Solomon's main port on the Mediterranean. Modern Dor was named after the ancient Phoenician city of Dor, which was inhabited by the tribe of Manasseh in the Israelite period. The city is mentioned in the Bible, in the Book of Joshua 17:11 and 1 Chronicles 7:29). The ancient city of Dor was situated on the excavated tell north of today's moshav, overlooking Kibbutz Nahsholim.

Archaeologists have excavated Roman temples and mosaic floors, as well as stone-walled houses from the Hellenistic period, when the site was known as Dora. Artifacts of beautiful Roman and Greek bowls, plates, jugs and jewelry are displayed at the nearby museum. From the 4th to the 7th century CE, Dor served as a Bishopric, but the Byzantine church was later abandoned. The village of Tantura was established in the area during the Arab period.

Moshav site

The modern moshav was established in 1949 by Jewish immigrants from Greece, who were later joined by Jewish refugees from Iraq on land of the forcibly depopulated Palestinian village of Tantura, east of the old village site. Today, according to a report in the newspaper Haaretz, a car park for the beaches of Dor and neighboring Nahsholim contains a mass grave from the 1948 Tantura massacre.

References

Moshavim
Populated places established in 1949
Populated places in Haifa District
1949 establishments in Israel
Greek-Jewish culture in Israel
Iraqi-Jewish culture in Israel